Parliamentary elections were held in Federal Republic of Yugoslavia on 31 May 1992. The elections were boycotted by almost all opposition parties in protest at both how the electoral law had been passed, and the unequal access to finance and the media given to the governing and opposition parties. Independent Milan Panić became federal Prime Minister. Following mass protests, Panić and federal President Dobrica Ćosić agreed to hold new elections in December under a new electoral system.

Results

References

Yugoslavia
1992 05
1992 in Yugoslavia
Yugoslavia